CKBC may refer to:

CKBC-FM, a Canadian radio station
Crazy Kouzu Basketball Club, an anime OVA